Leonard Sydney Dockett (5 March 1920 – 1 January 2008) was an Australian rules football player in the Victorian Football League, and he also played cricket for the VCA Colts cricket team in the 1938–39 and 1939–40 season, making 22 runs while there, and for Richmond in the 1938–39 and 1955–56 season, with a total of 121 runs.
 In December 2007, he was awarded a life membership to the Melbourne Football Club.

Dockett was a sergeant in the 14/32 battalion Australian Imperial Force during World War II and served in Papua New Guinea. He died on 1 January 2008, in Melbourne, Victoria.

References

External links

History of the Richmond Cricket Club at Cricket Victoria

Melbourne Football Club players
Keith 'Bluey' Truscott Trophy winners
Mordialloc Football Club players
Australian Army personnel of World War II
Richmond cricketers
Australian rules footballers from Melbourne
1920 births
2008 deaths
Australian Army soldiers
Melbourne Football Club Premiership players
One-time VFL/AFL Premiership players
People from Carlton, Victoria